State Route 165 (SR 165) is a state highway in the U.S. state of Alabama. It runs through Holy Trinity, Alabama in the eastern part of the state.

Route description
SR 165 begins at US 431 in Barbour County before heading north past the junction with SR 285, which leads to Lakepoint State Park. It travels near Eufaula National Wildlife Refuge before it enters Russell County and intersects SR 208 near Cottonton. SR 165 then goes through Holy Trinity and Fort Mitchell as it goes near the Fort Mitchell National Cemetery and terminates at US 431 near the Columbus, Georgia metropolitan area.

While a rural highway, traffic counts are quite high due to MeadWestvaco operations at Cottonton, and because it is a frequent route for tourists headed to the Florida Gulf Coast.

Major intersections

See also

References

External links

165
Transportation in Barbour County, Alabama
Transportation in Russell County, Alabama